Gowrie was the name of a number of ships operated by the Dundee, Perth and London Shipping company.

, in service 1909-17
, in service 1919-40
, in service 1945-48
, in service 1948-58
, in service 1959-63

Ship names